The Palestine Railways P class was a type of standard gauge mixed traffic steam locomotive on Palestine Railways and its successor Israel Railways. The PMR introduced the class in 1935 and Israel Railways withdrew the last ones in 1960.

Background
Palestine Railways was founded in 1920 to operate all railways in the League of Nations Mandate of Palestine. The mainstays of its locomotive fleet were its 50 H class 4-6-0s built by Baldwin in Pennsylvania in 1918, covering most duties on the main line between Haifa in Palestine and El Kantara East on the Suez Canal in Egypt via Lydda, Gaza and El Arish. Its daily Haifa – El Kantara through service was hardly an express, but it included two Wagons-Lits cars and early in the 1930s PR sought a more powerful locomotive to improve its performance.

Characteristics

The locomotives were typically British in design but the tenders were not. Most tender locomotives in Britain had six-wheel tenders but PR opted for more American-style bogie tenders, reportedly to carry more water. However, PR's track was not the highest quality so the fact that bogie vehicles ride better and may be less prone to derailment may have been another factor.

In service all members of the class were painted black. From 1944 the number of each locomotive was painted in very large numerals on the side of its tender.

World War II and after
PR had fuelled its locomotives with Welsh coal but in June 1940 Italy declared war on the Allies, making the Mediterranean extremely dangerous for British merchant shipping. PR therefore began converting its locomotives to burn oil, but it did not complete the conversion programme until 1943.

Palestine Railways was strategically important to the British Mandate authorities, so paramilitaries frequently attacked it during the 1936–1939 Arab revolt in Palestine and especially the 1946–48 1947–1949 Palestine war. El Kantara – Haifa trains were a particular target and Zionist paramilitaries bombed them three times during the 1947–1949 Palestine war. The P class survived these attacks and PR's Quishon workshops in Haifa managed to repair any damage.

After the UK withdrew from Mandate Palestine in May 1948 all six P class passed into Israel Railways stock. After the War of Independence and subsequent 1948 Arab–Israeli War, main line services were truncated to the territory within the new State of Israel. By 1956 diesels had taken over the main line services and steam workings were largely confined to the central part of the country around Lod (formerly Lydda). The P class remained in service until the official end of steam on Israel Railways in 1959. All six were scrapped in about 1960 but the tender of number 62 is preserved at the Israel Railway Museum in Haifa.

References

Sources

4-6-0 locomotives
1935 establishments in Mandatory Palestine
Railway locomotives introduced in 1935
History of Mandatory Palestine
Steam locomotives of Mandatory Palestine
NBL locomotives
Scrapped locomotives
Standard gauge locomotives of Mandatory Palestine
Standard gauge steam locomotives of Egypt
Standard gauge steam locomotives of Israel